José Simplicio Yap Alba or José Simplicio Alba III, better known as R. D. Alba after his parents' initials, is a film and television director. He was born in Cebu, Philippines on September 4, 1978 to parents Drs. Disi Yap and Rey Cadagat Alba. He is the eldest of five children.

Alba studied drama at Jacksonville State University in Alabama and moved to Los Angeles to study film directing at the Los Angeles Film School in Hollywood, California.

Career 
At age 23, Alba became the youngest filmmaker to direct 175 episodes of a serial drama TV series on ABS-CBN Regional Network, titled Kapalaran.

He then produced the award-winning Panaghoy sa suba, directed by Cesar Montano.

He directed a remake of the popular sitcom Milyonaryong Mini on ABS-CBN for 60 episodes.

In 2011, he directed Biktima, which was to be released on September 19, 2012 by Star Cinema. It starred Angel Aquino and Cesar Montano.

He finished directing a talk show on TFC (The Filipino Channel) titled RSVP, with Giselle Tongi and Dr. Tess Mauricio, which aired in fall of 2011 and wrapped its second season in April 2012. It aired on GMA Pinoy TV from June to September 2012.

He directed Seasons 1 and 2 of The On Your Marc Show, Lifestyle Network's top-rated show.

Filmography

References

1978 births
Living people
Visayan people
People from Cebu
Filipino film directors
Filipino television directors
Jacksonville State University alumni